The 2017 Hampton Downs TRS round was the third round of the 2017 Toyota Racing Series. The event was held at Hampton Downs Motorsport Park, in North Waikato, New Zealand from 28 to 29 January 2017.

Background 

Heading into the weekend, Richard Verschoor leads the championship by an extensive margin. Strong, consistent performances from the young Dutchman meant he was the man to beat. Other strong performances in the field included the likes of Thomas Randle, who was a constant front runner in the first two rounds of the championship.

Report

Practice 
Thomas Randle demonstrated his pace early on by taking out four out of the five practice sessions and broke the track record in the process. Pedro Piquet took out the second practice session, narrowly beating out Randle.

Race 1

Qualifying 
Randle dominated qualifying by taking pole position by nearly two-tenths of a second over Jehan Daruvala. They were followed by Armstrong, Leitch and Piquet.

Race 
After a chaotic start which saw Leitch and Daruvala tumbling down the order, Marcus Armstrong came through to win his second race of the year. An early red flag saw the race restarted with a shortened distance. After losing out the lead,

Race 2

Race 3

Qualifying 
Randle once again snatched pole position, though this time with a narrow margin over Daruvala. They were followed by Piquet, Verschoor and Armstrong.

Race 
After a chaotic start which saw Leitch and Daruvala tumbling down the order, Marcus Armstrong came through to win his second race of the year. An early red flag saw the race restarted with a shortened distance. After losing out the lead,

References

Teretonga Park TRS round
Teretonga Park TRS round